The 2009 Japanese motorcycle Grand Prix was the second round of the 2009 Grand Prix motorcycle racing season. It took place on the weekend of 24–26 April 2009 at the Twin Ring Motegi, located in Motegi, Japan. The MotoGP race was the 700th premier class race in the history of Grand Prix motorcycle racing.
Jorge Lorenzo won the MotoGP race ahead of teammate Valentino Rossi to take the overall lead in the world championship.

Qualifying
All qualifying sessions for MotoGP, 250cc and 125cc were cancelled due to adverse weather conditions and grid positions for Sunday's races were defined according to combined free practice times.

MotoGP classification

250 cc classification

125 cc classification

Championship standings after the race (MotoGP)

Below are the standings for the top five riders and constructors after round two has concluded. 

Riders' Championship standings

Constructors' Championship standings

 Note: Only the top five positions are included for both sets of standings.

References

Japanese motorcycle Grand Prix
Japanese
Motorcycle Grand Prix
April 2009 sports events in Japan